Federico Garza (born 23 December 1964) is a Mexican equestrian. He competed in the team jumping event at the 1984 Summer Olympics.

References

1964 births
Living people
Mexican male equestrians
Olympic equestrians of Mexico
Equestrians at the 1984 Summer Olympics
Place of birth missing (living people)